Federico I Gonzaga (25 June 1441 – 14 July 1484) was marquess of Mantua from 1478 to 1484, as well as a condottiero.

Biography
Federico was born in Mantua in 1441, son of Ludovico III and Barbara of Brandenburg. He was a good friend of the court painter Andrea Mantegna and received an education from Mantegna's mother as well as from Vittorino da Feltre (d. 1446) and above all from Iacopo da San Cassiano (from 1446 to 1449) and Ognibene da Lonigo (from 1449).

Federico fought for the Sforza of Milan until 1470 and succeeded to the marquisate on 14 June 1478. He was, however, forced to split much of the Mantuan possessions with his brothers.

Federico continued to fight as a condottiero, and during his frequent absences Mantua was administered by Eusebio Malatesta, while the local army was under his brother-in-law, Francesco Secco d'Aragona. Federico took part in numerous actions in defence of the Duchy of Milan, in particular against the aggressive Republic of Venice. During one of these wars Francesco Secco occupied Asola and other Venetian territories. Later, after the peace, Ludovico Sforza of Milan asked for the return of Asola to Milan, to which Frederick had to acquiesce.

Federico died in Mantua at the age of 43, and was buried in the church of Sant'Andrea.

Family
In 1463 Federico married Margaret of Bavaria, daughter of Albert III, Duke of Bavaria and Anna, Duchess of Brunswick-Grubenhagen; and sister of John IV, Duke of Bavaria. They had the following issue:

 Clara (1464–1503) married in 1482 to Gilbert of Bourbon-Montpensier Duke of Sessa
 Francesco II (1466–1519), Marquess of Mantua; married in 1490 to Isabella d'Este granddaughter of King Ferdinand I of Naples
 Sigismondo (1469–1525)
 Elisabetta (1471–1526) married in 1489  to Guidobaldo da Montefeltro Duke of Urbino
 Maddelena (1472–1490) married in 1489 to Giovanni Sforza Lord of Pesaro and Gradara
 Giovanni (1474–1525) married in 1493 Laura Bentivoglio (d. 1523) and had issue. His descendants, the Marquises of Vescovato, have been the senior line of the House of Gonzaga since the 18th century.

Ancestry

See also
Italian Wars

References

Sources

Further reading

External links
Biography 

Federico 1
Federico 1
15th-century condottieri
Military leaders of the Italian Wars
1441 births
1484 deaths